Zanjireh (also Romanized as Zanjīreh and Zanjirah; also known as Zandzhira and Zanjira) is a village in Koshksaray Rural District of Koshksaray District, Marand County, East Azerbaijan province, Iran. At the 2006 National Census, its population was 2,486 in 524 households. The following census in 2011 counted 2,556 people in 684 households. The latest census in 2016 showed a population of 2,597 people in 751 households; it is the center of its rural district.

References 

Marand County

Populated places in East Azerbaijan Province

Populated places in Marand County